In architecture, a steeple is a tall tower on a building, topped by a spire and often incorporating a belfry and other components. Steeples are very common on Christian churches and cathedrals and the use of the term generally connotes a religious structure. They might be stand-alone structures, or incorporated into the entrance or center of the building.

Architecture

Towers were not a part of Christian churches until about AD 600, when they were adapted from military watchtowers. At first they were fairly modest and entirely separate structures from churches. Over time, they were incorporated into the church building and capped with ever-more-elaborate roofs until the steeple resulted.

Towers are a common element of religious architecture worldwide and are generally viewed as attempts to reach skyward toward heavens and the divine.
Some wooden steeples are built with large wooden structural members  arranged like tent poles and braced diagonally inside both with wood and steel.  The steeple is then clad with wooden boards and finished with slate tiles nailed to the boards using copper over gaps on corners where the slate would not cover.

Threats to steeples
Steeples can be vulnerable to earthquakes. A number of Romanian churches feature unusually slender steeples, and over half of these have been lost to earthquakes. Because of their height, steeples can also be vulnerable to lightning, which can start fires within steeples. An example of this is Holy Trinity Catholic Church in Luxemburg, Iowa, which lost its steeple in a fire believed to have been started by a lightning strike.

See also

Bell-gable
Bell tower
Flèche
Minaret

References

External links
 

Church architecture
Timber framing

eo:Spajro